Uda District may refer to:

Uda District, Nara, Japan
Uda District of Iwaki Province, Japan during the Nara period
Wuda District, Wuhai, Inner Mongolia, China (sometimes called Uda District)